There were two Battles of the Marne, taking place near the Marne River in Marne, France during World War I:

 First Battle of the Marne (1914)
 Second Battle of the Marne (1918)